New Mills is a town in the Borough of High Peak, Derbyshire, England,  south-east of Stockport and  from Manchester at the confluence of the River Goyt and Sett.

New Mills has a population of approximately 12,000, in a civil parish which includes the villages and hamlets of Whitle, Thornsett, Hague Bar, Rowarth, Brookbottom, Gowhole and Birch Vale.

New Mills was first noted for coal mining, then for cotton spinning, bleaching and calico printing. It was served by the Peak Forest Canal, three railway lines and the A6 trunk road. Redundant mills were bought up in the mid-twentieth century by sweet manufacturer Swizzels Matlow. New Mills was a stronghold of Methodism.

History
New Mills is in the area formerly known as Bowden Middlecale which was a grouping of ten hamlets. The name of New Mylne (New Mills) was given to it from a corn-mill, erected in 1391, near to the present Salem Mill on the River Sett in the hamlet of Ollersett. This was adjacent to a convenient bridge over the Sett. By the late sixteenth century the name was applied to the group of houses that grew up round it. Coal mining was the first industry of the area, with up to 40 small pits and mines exploiting the Yard Seam. The climate, good construction stone and the availability of stable land by fast-flowing water was ideal for cotton spinning. Cotton mills and print-works were built in the Torrs Gorge from 1788. Dwellings were built on the sides of the gorge, sometimes with one home built on top of another, both being entered at their respective street levels. Examples still exist on Station Road and Meal Street.

By 1810, New Mills had nine cotton mills, plus three weaving mills and at least three printworks.

Pigot's Directory 1835 describes New Mills:

A second group of 'later' mills formed by the newly opened Peak Forest Canal in Newtown, a hamlet 800 m away on the other side of the Goyt in what was then the parish of Disley in Cheshire. Increasingly these mills and houses merged into New Mills. The soft iron-free water was suitable for bleaching and finishing and printing. With the advent of steam, and the growth of the canal network to transport raw cotton, coal and the finished product, bigger mills were built and the smaller isolated rural mills were no longer competitive. By 1846, most of New Mills' mills had stopped spinning. The small mills moved out of cotton; the larger mills along the canal moved into finishing. Torr Vale Mill had added a weaving shed in 1836, and moved into producing towelling.

The commercial method of calico printing using engraved rollers was invented in 1821 in New Mills. John Potts of Potts, Oliver and Potts used a copper-engraved master to produce rollers to transfer the inks.

Before the construction of the high-level bridges the Torrs was a major obstacle; traffic had to descend  to cross the Goyt and then climb the same height on the other bank. The first bridge to be constructed was the Queens Bridge on Church Road. The Union Road bridge was built in 1884; obtaining the land was difficult, as the arches needed to pass close to Torr Mill and properties on the Cheshire (south) bank, and Torr Top Hall had to be demolished. The new road was named after the 'union' of the two halves of the town. The first station in New Mills was at Newtown, on the Stockport, Disley and Whaley Bridge Railway; this opened 9 June 1855. This followed the line of the Peak Forest Canal staying safely away from the Torrs. The Sheffield and Midland Railway Companies' Committee company built two viaducts across the Goyt: one for a line to New Mills Central that opened in 1864, and one for the fast line through the Disley Tunnel which opened in 1904.

Cotton continued to be worked at Torr Vale Mill until 2000, giving the mill over two hundred years of service.

In the great storm of June 1872, Grove Mill and Torr Vale weir were destroyed; at Rock Mill, then being used to make paper, two blocks of buildings and considerable stock and some machinery were lost, but the only fatalities were two cows.

The River Goyt at about two o’clock a.m. on Wednesday was from 12ft to 14ft above its usual height...At New Mills, where the Goyt is joined by the River Kinder, extensive damage was done to property. The paper works of Messrs. Schlosser and Co. were damaged upwards of £1,500 as two blocks of buildings were completely washed away – one portion contained a large quantity of paper. The works of Mr. W.S. Lowe also sufferd severely, the damage being estimated at £300. Two strong stone weirs were washed away and two bridges; many acres of land were flooded. – Manchester Times

This was minor compared with events at Whaley Bridge, where Toddbrook Reservoir was overtopped and another reservoir known as Adsheads Pools breached completely, the waters sweeping through the centre of the village of Hurdsfield. The June 1930 flood was more serious for New Mills. Many properties on Brookside were flooded and destroyed and one rescuer was drowned. Hyde Bank Road was engulfed and buildings collapsed at Arnfield's foundry. At Rowarth, the remains of the Little Mill and the landlord of the Little Mill Inn were swept away. At Watford Bridge the river took away part of the printworks, and at Bate Mill gouged a new channel taking with it the sewage plant, 250 tons of coal, most of the road and the gas main. At Birch Vale, the problem was caused by the waters cascading down from Lantern Pike; the culvert being inadequate, the roadways became rivers washing away sections of walling. Much livestock perished.

A model of the town under construction in 1884 can be found in New Mills Heritage And Information Centre, which is run and managed by volunteers and funded and managed by New Mills Town Council.

Government

Now almost entirely in Derbyshire, New Mills straddled the historic county boundaries of Derbyshire and Cheshire. The traditional boundary was the River Goyt: Low Leighton, Torr Top and Hide Bank were always in Derbyshire, but Torr Vale Road and all of Newtown were in Cheshire. Indeed, today, all the housing to the west of the traffic lights on the A6 remains in the civil parish of Disley in Cheshire.

The area was part of the Royal Forest of the Peak which passed into the hands of the Duchy of Lancaster in 1372. The ten hamlets, in three groups:

Great Hamlet, Phoside and Kinder;
Beard, Ollersett, Thornsett and Whitle;
Chinley, Bugsworth and Brownside

made up Bowden Middlecale. The new manorial mill or the New Mylne of 1391 was at Beard. In 1713 the hamlets of Beard, Ollersett, Thornsett and Whitle were formed into a township and a new corn mill was built at Ollersett. This was superseded by the New Mills Urban Sanitary Authority in 1876. The New Mills Urban District Council operated from 1894 until 1974, when it was abolished. The town now has a town council, and is part of High Peak Council, and Derbyshire County Council. On the County Council, New Mills is in the New Mills division along with Hayfield and Sett. The seat is held by Anne Clarke for the Labour Party. On High Peak Council, Sett has one councillor, New Mills East elects two councillors and New Mills West elects two councillors. New Mills Town Council is the local level of elected governance.

Robert Largan, a Conservative Party member, is the member of parliament for the High Peak constituency.

Geography

New Mills is approximately  NNW of London and 8 miles (13 km) south-east of Stockport. It borders on Disley, in Cheshire, and Marple, in the Stockport Metropolitan Borough in Greater Manchester. The town is on the north-western edge of the Peak District, but only the eastern part of the parish is within the official boundaries of the National Park. The town includes the hamlets of Thornsett, Hague Bar, Rowarth, Brookbottom, Gowhole, and most of Birch Vale. Various parts of the town are given local names: Eaves Knoll (north-western part between Brook Bottom Road and Castle Edge Road); High Lee (northern part between Castle Edge Road and the River Sett); Hidebank (the area on the eastern side of the River Sett and north and west of the A6015); Low Leighton (the area south and east of the A6015); and Torr Top (the area around the confluence of the rivers).

At its lowest point the parish is about 120m above sea level, but the valley sides rise to 370m at the highest points above Rowarth. The watercourses to the north, particularly the Rowarth Brook, drain the southward slopes of Mellor Moor, Cown Edge and Lantern Pike. The Sett and its tributary the Kinder drain much of the plateau of Kinder Scout; the Sett flows through Hayfield before passing through Birch Vale to the Torrs and the River Goyt. The Goyt rises on the moors of Axe Edge, near the River Dane and the Cat and Fiddle Inn between Buxton and Macclesfield. It passes through Whaley Bridge, where it is joined by the Todd Brook and the Black Brook from Chapel-en-le-Frith. The sides of the Goyt valley have been used to carry two railway lines, the Peak Forest Canal and the A6 trunk road from London to Carlisle via Manchester; these all pass through New Mills.

Geologically speaking, New Mills lies in the north–south-orientated syncline known as the Goyt Trough. The base rocks are from the Carboniferous period, with underlying Namurian gritstone sandstones, from 333 M a.to 313 M a. Above there are coal measures present (Langsettian from 312 M a.). This was folded in the Variscan orogeny into the Goyt Trough syncline. Coal has been mined at over 30 locations in the area, including Pingot Pit. There are three narrow seams of coal present: the Red Ash, Little Mine and the Yard Seam. The Yard Coal is so named because that is the average thickness of the seam; it is the lowest seam and rests on Woodhead Hill Sandstone. In these seams lead ore has also been extracted. Beardmoor Colliery, Ollersett or Burnt Edge Colliery and Lee or New Mills Colliery all worked the  seam.  of coal weighs about half an imperial ton, and the Yard Seam would produce 4500 tons per acre.

The syncline was buried in younger rocks of the Tertiary Period. These were eroded, not least by the scouring of the ice age ice sheets and the pressures of the meltwaters when temperatures rose. New Mills was on the margins of glaciation, and the meltwaters sought additional routes under the ice for run off. They exploited faults and crevices in the underlying rock. In the Torrs Gorge, the Rivers Goyt and Sett cut a new channel into the strata of the Woodhead Hill Sandstone which forms the centre of New Mills. A mantle of glacial sediment, principally gravels, covered the whole of the braided valleys. In the Pleistocene period, of 12.9 k a to 11.6 k a, the rivers re-formed into single channels, and meanders were formed. These became very distorted above the constrictions of the gorges. Down cutting occurred, exposing previous layers, creating terraces that were covered with silty clay alluvium.

Economy
New Mills' economy was originally built on agriculture, then coal mining and then cotton spinning and bleaching. There was a little weaving but cotton bleaching and calico printing continued into the second half of the twentieth century. The mills have now all closed. Today Swizzels Matlow, who make children's sweets, is a large employer. The company transferred to New Mills from London during the Blitz and has remained ever since.

There is also a history of iron working, though this has ceased. Ironstone was also found in shales of the lower coal measures, and early water-powered charcoal furnaces were located at Gow-Hole furnace towards Furness Vale. In the nineteenth century, the Midland Iron Works occupied Barnes Mill in the Torrs; the Victoria Foundry was on Hyde Bank Road (among their products were gas lamp posts for the town council) as was the other small foundry in Wilde's scrapyard. On Albion Road in Newtown is John Hawthorn's foundry. There was also a brass foundry, on the site of the current Heritage Centre.

Tourism was boosted in 1984 when the Torrs was reopened as a riverside park, and further when the Millennium Walkway opened in 1999, joining the two ends of the gorge.

The Plain English Campaign has its headquarters in the town.

Since 2015, New Mills has had a commercial microbrewery, Torrside Brewing, located within an industrial unit at New Mills Marina.

Landmarks

New Mills sits above The Torrs, a dramatic gorge through which the Rivers Goyt and Sett flow. In a bend of the Goyt is Torr Vale Mill, a Grade II* listed building. The Torrs Millennium Walkway, overlooking the mill, was built at a cost of £525,000 (with almost half provided by the Millennium Commission) by Derbyshire County Council's in-house engineers. The walkway spans the otherwise inaccessible cliff wall above the River Goyt. Part rises from the riverbed on stilts and part is cantilevered off the railway retaining wall. It provided the final link in the  Midshires Way (here following the Goyt Way) and was opened in April 2000.

Torrs Hydro is a 2.4-metre-diameter screw turbine at the Torr Weir on the Goyt. The "Reverse Archimedean Screw" micro hydroelectric scheme generates 50 kW of electricity. Nicknamed "Archie", it is owned by the community. The electricity is supplied to the local Co-operative supermarket and any excess is fed back into the national grid.

Religious sites

The area around Mellor and New Mills has a strong Methodist tradition. John Wesley first preached in the area in 1740, at a sheepfold at the Bongs in neighbouring Mellor. He visited again on 28 April 1745, 12 May 1747 and 31 August 1748. The Wesleyan Methodists were established in 1748. At first, meetings were held in people's homes; then land was bought on the High Street for a Wesleyan chapel in 1766. This was the first place of worship in the town. Wesley visited again in 1768, 1772, 1774, 1776, 1779, 1782 and 1788. By 1808 that chapel was too small, and a larger one was built in St Georges Road, Brookside (Low Leighton).The church was influential and many of the millowners were members: Samuel Schofield, of Warksmoor House and of Torr Mill, the Armstrongs of Torr Vale Mill, the Hibbert family, including Robert Hibbert, of Warksmoor who built the first cotton mill in Newtown, the Barnes, Thatchers, Arnfields, Bridges, Willans and Bennetts, all industrialists, are buried in the chapel except Robert Hibbert who is buried at St Mary's Slough. The larger chapel was closed and demolished in the 1960s and the Methodists have reverted to the High Street Chapel. The Association Methodists' stone chapel was erected in 1838, and the Primitive Methodists built one in 1827. The Friends Meeting House dating from 1717 is in Low Leighton, and the independents, the Congregational (Independent) church, "Providence", was built on Mellor Road, Whitle, in 1823.

The hamlets of Bowden Middlecale and Mellor were originally in the ancient parish of Glossop. Chapelries were established at Mellor and Hayfield, and New Mills was split between the two. The Church of England parish church of St George's was built in 1829–30 to a simple renaissance plan with galleries; it has 7 bays, decorated with simple Gothic-style lancet windows. It 1844 the hamlets of Beard, Ollersett, Thornsett and Whitle became a parish. The Anglican church of St James the Less was designed by William Swinden Barber in 1880. It became redundant, was restored in 2012, and became Spring Bank Arts Centre.

The Church of the Annunciation, St. Mary's Road, is the Roman Catholic church. It is in the parish of St Mary'ś, Marple Bridge and New Mills in the Diocese of Nottingham.

Transport

Rail
New Mills is served by two railway stations: New Mills Central on the Hope Valley Line, on the north bank of the River Goyt, and New Mills Newtown on the Buxton Line, which runs on the south bank on the 175m contour. The main Manchester to Sheffield 'fast' line passes through between the town centre and Newtown, bypassing both stations. It emerges from the Disley Tunnel on a lower (150m) contour than the canal on the south bank, crosses the Goyt on a viaduct and is joined by the Hope Valley Line at New Mills South Junction. It is now the Sett Valley Trail, a shared-use path running for 2½ miles north-east out of the town.

Bus
New Mills town centre and bus station is served by several bus services operated by High Peak and Stagecoach Manchester. High Peak operate the 60 to Macclesfield and Hayfield, the 61 north to Glossop via Hayfield or south to Buxton via Whaley Bridge and the 389, which serves various points in and around the town. Stagecoach operates one service in the town, the 358, which runs from Stockport to Hayfield via Marple.

Another High Peak service, the 199, also serves Newtown throughout the day, with four early-morning services into the town centre, and runs from Buxton to Manchester Airport via Stockport.

Road
The A6 passes through Newtown, running close to the Buxton railway line; it travels north towards Stockport and Manchester, and south towards Chapel-en-le-Frith and Buxton. The main road running through New Mills is the A6015, which connects it to the A6 and to Hayfield. The B6101 also connects the town to neighbouring Marple.

Canal

The Peak Forest Canal was watered in 1796. It passes through Newtown, where there is a marina, following the 155m contour.

Culture and community
New Mills Town Council hosts a free bonfire and fireworks display in High Lea Park during November, which in 2013 attracted an estimated 3,000 people. New Mills also plays host to the One World Festival every year, also in High Lea Park. The biggest event in the town's cultural calendar is New Mills Festival. Held during the last two weeks of September, it is two weeks of talks, walks, gigs, concerts, exhibitions, sport, competitions with a lantern procession and street party on the last Saturday.

Education
The principal secondary school is New Mills School. This comprehensive school occupies the buildings of the former New Mills Grammar School and educates children from 11 to 16 years of age; its sixth-form closed in 2018. There are six primary schools: St. George's School (CE), St. Mary's (RC), New Mills County Primary, Newtown, Hague Bar and Thornsett.

Conservation Area
New Mills town centre has been designated a Conservation Area. The Conservation Area was originally established in 1985, although has been extended several times since then. Currently, the Conservation Area extends to encompass the Jodrell Street, Spring Bank and High Lea areas of the town.

High Peak Borough Council have produced a Conservation Area Character Appraisal document, outlining the reasons that the Conservation Area has been designated as such. In justifying the reasons for designation, this document states of the town: “New Mills is a town of dramatic topography and origins that date back to the 14th century. Its topography and the supply of fast flowing waters led to its development as a thriving mill town and important centre for the textile industry. Its impressive landscape developed much of its developed form and the townscape that we still see today.”

Sport and leisure
New Mills A.F.C. ('The Millers') are the local football team and play in the Northern Premier League Division One North. The football ground at Church Lane boasts two pitches — one 'all weather' — and floodlights. New Mills Cricket Club, with their ground on Church Road, play in the Derbyshire and Cheshire League. There is a leisure centre, including a swimming pool, which opened in 1980. Until the early 1980s, the town held an annual cycle race.

New Mills Golf Club is a members' club set on the top of the northerly hill overlooking the town, with views of Kinder Scout, the city of Manchester and the Welsh mountains. The course was formed in 1907 and extended to its current 18-hole, 5604-yard par 69 course in 2002 before the clubhouse extension and centenary celebration in 2007.

Notable residents

James Abrahams, footballer with Notts County F.C. was born in the town.
Tony Audenshaw, actor (Bob Hope in Emmerdale), singer and marathon runner, lives in the town.
Blitz, a street punk/Oi! band of the early 1980s, originated in New Mills.
Thomas Handford: a plaque at the town's former prison is inscribed:
A working man, a teetotaler for ten years, who was formerly a notorious drinker and a notorious poacher has recently invested his sober earnings in the purchase of the town prison which he has converted into a comfortable dwelling house. Frequently an inmate of the prison whilst a drunkard and poacher, he is now owner of the whole and occupier of the premises. Thomas Handford 1854.

See also
List of mills in Derbyshire
Listed buildings in New Mills

References

External links

New Mills Town Council
New Mills Local History Society
Steve Lewis: History of New Mills
Visit New Mills

 
Towns in Derbyshire
Towns and villages of the Peak District
Civil parishes in Derbyshire
High Peak, Derbyshire